Beesd is a village in the Dutch province of Gelderland. It is a part of the municipality of West Betuwe, and lies about 16 km west of Tiel. It is situated near the river Linge and has a railway station on the railway from Dordrecht to Geldermalsen.

History 
Beesd was first mentioned in 1224 as "in Beseth". The etymology is unclear. Beesd was founded in the Early Middle Ages on a stream ridge. It developed into a stretched out esdorp.

The Dutch Reformed church is an aisleless church with detached tower. The lower part of tower dates from around 1500. The current church is the result of an extensive modification and rebuilding in 1825.

Beesd was home to 1,282 people in 1840. Beesd was an independent municipality. In 1883, Beesd railway station opened on the Dordrecht to Elst railway line. The building was demolished in 1985, but it is still an active station.

In 1978, it was merged into Geldermalsen. In 2019, it became part of West Betuwe.

Notable people

 Abraham Kuyper, pastor, journalist, and Prime Minister of the Netherlands.  Kuyper served as the pastor of the Reformed Church in Beesd from 1863 to 1867.

Gallery

References

External links

  Beesd website

Populated places in Gelderland
Former municipalities of Gelderland
West Betuwe